Schweetz may refer to:
FAO Schweetz, the candy department of FAO Schwarz
Vanellope von Schweetz, a character from the animated film franchise Wreck-It Ralph